Christopher John Killen (born 8 October 1981) is a former New Zealand international footballer. Killen grew up in Wellington and played his club football for Miramar Rangers. After a trial with Manchester City, he joined City's youth academy. His first senior club appearances came during a loan spell at Wrexham in September 2000, and the following season he was loaned to Port Vale. Killen joined Oldham Athletic in July 2002 for £250,000, but failed to match his price tag because of persistent injury, and was eventually released on a free transfer.

In January 2006, Killen joined Hibernian, and scored 11 goals in the early part of the 2006–07 season, but a ruptured Achilles tendon prematurely ended his season in January. Killen's contract with Hibernian expired in the summer of 2007, and, after using the Easter Road cub's facilities to regain fitness, he then signed for Celtic on a three-year contract, but found first team opportunities hard to come by, and was loaned to Norwich City during the 2008–09 season. Killen rejoined his former Celtic manager Gordon Strachan at Middlesbrough in January 2010. Seven months later he moved to China to play for Shenzhen Ruby. He switched clubs to Chongqing in February 2012.

Killen made his international debut for New Zealand during the 2000 OFC Nations Cup, and was included in the New Zealand U23 squad for their appearance at the 2008 Summer Olympics as one of three over age players. He was also named as part of the New Zealand squad for the 2002 OFC Nations Cup, 2003 and 2009 FIFA Confederations Cup, and the 2010 FIFA World Cup.

Club career

Early career
Born in Wellington, Killen grew up in the Wellington suburb of Island Bay. As a youth he attended Rongotai College. He represented the college in junior grades, and was selected to tour Australia with the New Zealand Secondary Schools representative team in 1998, along with future "All Whites" Leo Bertos and Tony Lochhead.

Killen played his club football for Miramar Rangers, whose coach arranged a trial with Manchester City. The trial was successful, and the 17-year-old Killen joined City's youth academy. His first senior club appearances came during a loan spell at Second Division side Wrexham in September 2000, then managed by Brian Flynn. He scored his first league goal on 9 September against Oldham Athletic, and in total scored three goals in nine appearances for the Welsh club. The following season, he was loaned to Brian Horton's Second Division Port Vale. He scored on his debut on 25 September, in a 3–1 win over former club Wrexham at the Racecourse Ground. He scored in a 3–1 defeat at Wycombe Wanderers four days later, before scoring a brace in a 5–0 win over Cambridge United on his home debut at Vale Park on 5 October. He ended his loan tally with six goals in nine games for the "Valiants". In November 2001, he was recalled from his loan by manager Kevin Keegan as a number of Manchester City strikers were injured, and played as a substitute in a 2–1 First Division win against Rotherham United. He made two further substitute appearances that season, and finished as top goalscorer for the reserves.

Oldham Athletic
He joined Oldham Athletic in July 2002, after manager Iain Dowie spent £250,000 to acquire the young striker. He went on to score just four goals in 33 appearances in 2002–03. During the 2003–04 campaign he featured 13 times, scoring two goals.

Killen was the club's top scorer in the 2004–05 season, with 15 goals in 30 starts. Killen was "jinxed" by injury, however, and after a further twelve appearances in 2005–06, Oldham allowed him to move to Hibernian on a free transfer. After Killen had left the club, recently appointed manager Ronnie Moore claimed that Killen had "underachieved" during his time with the club. The club's managing director also issued a statement on the club website stating that Killen had cost £13,000 per game and £36,000 per goal due to his injury record and expensive contract.

Hibernian
In January 2006, Killen joined Hibernian (Hibs) on a free transfer. He made his debut against Hearts on 28 January, and then scored on his second appearance as he netted the third goal in Hibs' 3–0 defeat of Rangers at Ibrox in the Scottish Cup fourth round on 4 February. Four days later he scored his first goal at Easter Road, the opener in a 7–0 win over Livingston. He scored five goals for Hibs by the end of the 2005–06 season.

Killen scored the opening goal the 5–0 win over Latvian club Dinaburg in the UEFA Intertoto Cup second-round game at Easter Road on 2 July 2006. Following the departure of strikers Garry O'Connor and Derek Riordan, Killen was expected to be an important player for Hibs in the 2006–07 season. By December 2006 he had scored 11 goals, including two in a 2–1 win over Rangers. During a 2–2 Scottish Cup draw with Aberdeen in January, however, Killen suffered a ruptured Achilles tendon which ended his season. Killen's contract with Hibernian expired in the summer of 2007 and he rejected the offer of a one-year extension from the Edinburgh club.

Celtic
Killen was expected to sign for Cardiff City, but he instead signed for Celtic on a three-year contract in May 2007. Killen made his debut on 5 August, coming off the bench in a goalless draw against Kilmarnock at Celtic Park. His first goal for the club came on 7 October at Fir Park; with Celtic trailing 1–0 to Gretna, Killen equalised in the 89th minute before Scott McDonald scored the winner for Celtic in stoppage time. He made his UEFA Champions League debut on 3 October in a shock 2–1 victory over A.C. Milan at Celtic Park. He made just three league starts in 2007–08, though came off the bench 24 times.

After that, however, he found chances hard to come by as he found himself behind Scott McDonald, Georgios Samaras and Jan Vennegoor of Hesselink in the pecking order. Killen played mostly for the Celtic reserve team, and hardly featured in the first team at all. On 31 January 2009, Killen joined Championship side Norwich City on loan for the remainder of the 2008–09 season. He made his first appearance for Bryan Gunn's "Canaries" in a 3–3 draw to Wolverhampton Wanderers at Molineux on 3 February, before he returned to training with Celtic after only making four substitute appearances at Carrow Road. At the end of the 2008–09 season, manager Gordon Strachan resigned and was replaced by Tony Mowbray, who had previously managed Killen at Hibernian.

Killen's hopes of regaining a first team place at Celtic for the 2009–10 season were boosted in pre-season friendly matches, as he scored two goals against Brisbane Roar and came off the bench to score in a 5–0 win against Al-Ahly. Killen then started Celtic's following pre-season match against Tottenham Hotspur, and he opened the scoring in this match with a neat headed finish following a pinpoint cross by teammate Paul Caddis. A further goal against Manchester City ensured he finished pre-season with five goals in five games. He scored his first league goal at Celtic Park on 20 September, Celtic's first goal in a 2–1 win against Hearts. Three days later he scored against Falkirk at Falkirk Stadium in a 4–0 win in the League Cup.

Middlesbrough
Killen returned to England in January 2010 and joined his former Celtic manager Gordon Strachan at Middlesbrough, along with teammates Willo Flood and Barry Robson. He scored his first goal at the Riverside Stadium on 9 February, in a 2–1 win over Barnsley. He scored two further headed goals in Championship games against Reading and Preston North End, but left the club after the end of the season when his contract expired in June 2010.

China
After being released by Middlesbrough, Killen signed a year and half contract with Chinese Super League side Shenzhen Ruby in July 2010, then managed by Siniša Gogić. Killen scored his first goal for the "Youth Army" on his debut against Liaoning Whowin at the Tiexi New District Sports Center on 28 July 2010. He finished his first half-year at Shenzhen Stadium with eight goals from thirteen matches to help the club to avoid relegation by a two-point margin. The club were relegated in 2011 after finishing bottom of the league under Philippe Troussier, despite Killen's nine goals.

Killen signed a contract with China League One club Chongqing on 17 February 2012; the club play at the 58,680 capacity Chongqing Olympic Sports Center. He finished the 2012 season as division's fourth highest scorer on 17 goals from 26 starts.

International career
Killen has represented New Zealand at under-20 and under-23 levels, and was included in the New Zealand under-23 squad for their first appearance at the Olympic Games as one of three over age players, alongside Ryan Nelsen and Simon Elliott.

Killen made his international debut for the New Zealand senior team during the 2000 OFC Nations Cup against Tahiti, three months before his first senior appearance at club level. The "All Whites" finished the tournament as runners-up, after losing 2–0 to Australia in the final. He was also in the squad for the 2002 OFC Nations Cup, which New Zealand won after beating Australia 1–0 at the Mount Smart Stadium. He was further named in the 2003 FIFA Confederations Cup, and featured in the defeats to Japan and Colombia at the group stage.

Killen featured in New Zealand's success at the 2008 OFC Nations Cup, though he played just one game – the 2–0 win over Fiji at Churchill Park. He was named as part of the 2009 FIFA Confederations Cup New Zealand squad to travel to South Africa. Killen scored twice in their final warm up game, a 4–3 defeat by World champions Italy. In the tournament itself, he played in the defeats to Spain and South Africa, and the draw with Iraq.

Killen also featured in the team that beat Bahrain in a two-legged Asia/Oceania play-off to qualify for the 2010 FIFA World Cup and was named in the New Zealand squad for the finals in South Africa, where New Zealand went unbeaten with three draws against Slovakia, Italy, and Paraguay; Killen played all three games.

Personal life
In September 2016, Killen admitted to sexually assaulting a young woman in England. After first denying the charge, Killen change his plea to guilty before he was due to go on trial. Killen received a 12-month jail term but it was suspended for 18 months, he was also ordered to undergo 20 hours of rehabilitation and to perform 200 hours of community service.

Career statistics

Club statistics

International statistics

International caps list
New Zealand's goal tally first.

Honours
New Zealand
OFC Nations Cup
Winners: 2002, 2008
Runners-up: 2004
Third place: 2012

Celtic
Scottish Premier League: 2007–08

Notes

References

External links

Player profile on NZ Football official website

1981 births
Living people
Association footballers from Wellington City
New Zealand people of English descent
New Zealand people of Irish descent
People educated at Rongotai College
New Zealand association footballers
New Zealand international footballers
Association football forwards
Miramar Rangers AFC players
New Zealand expatriate association footballers
Expatriate footballers in England
Manchester City F.C. players
Wrexham A.F.C. players
Port Vale F.C. players
Oldham Athletic A.F.C. players
Expatriate footballers in Scotland
Hibernian F.C. players
Celtic F.C. players
Norwich City F.C. players
Middlesbrough F.C. players
Expatriate footballers in China
New Zealand expatriate sportspeople in China
New Zealand expatriate sportspeople in England
Shenzhen F.C. players
English Football League players
Scottish Premier League players
Chinese Super League players
China League One players
Olympic association footballers of New Zealand
2000 OFC Nations Cup players
2002 OFC Nations Cup players
2003 FIFA Confederations Cup players
2004 OFC Nations Cup players
2008 OFC Nations Cup players
Footballers at the 2008 Summer Olympics
2009 FIFA Confederations Cup players
2010 FIFA World Cup players
2012 OFC Nations Cup players